The 1998 Dubai World Cup was a horse race held at Nad Al Sheba Racecourse on Saturday 28 March 1998. It was the 3rd running of the Dubai World Cup.

The winner was Beverly & Robert B. Lewis's Silver Charm, a four-year-old gray colt trained in the United States by Bob Baffert and ridden by Gary Stevens. Silver Charm's victory was the first in the race for his owner, trainer and jockey.

Silver Charm was named American Champion Three-Year-Old Male Horse for 1997 when he won the Kentucky Derby and the Preakness Stakes. Before being shipped to Dubai he won San Fernando Stakes in January and the Strub Stakes in February. In the 1998 Dubai World Cup Silver Charm took the lead approaching the final quarter mile and held off the late challenge of the Godolphin runner Swain by a short head with the French challenger Loup Sauvage two and a half lengths back in third place.

Race details
 Sponsor: none
 Purse: £2,439,024; First prize: £1,463,415
 Surface: Dirt
 Going: Fast
 Distance: 10 furlongs
 Number of runners: 9
 Winner's time: 2:04.29

Full result

 Abbreviations: DSQ = disqualified; nse = nose; nk = neck; shd = head; hd = head; nk = neck; dist = distance

Winner's details
Further details of the winner, Silver Charm
 Sex: Colt
 Foaled: 22 February 1994
 Country: United States
 Sire: Silver Buck; Dam: Bonnie's Poker (Poker)
 Owner: Beverly & Robert B. Lewis
 Breeder: Mary Wootton

References

Dubai World Cup
Dubai World Cup
Dubai World Cup
Dubai World Cup